Samiabad may refer to:
 Samiabad-e Arbab Din Mohammad
 Samiabad-e Hajji Aman